Ko Jung-sun (born 6 August 1971) is a South Korean fencer. She competed in the épée events at the 1996 and 2000 Summer Olympics.

References

1971 births
Living people
South Korean female fencers
Olympic fencers of South Korea
Fencers at the 1996 Summer Olympics
Fencers at the 2000 Summer Olympics
Asian Games medalists in fencing
Fencers at the 1998 Asian Games
Asian Games gold medalists for South Korea
Asian Games silver medalists for South Korea
Medalists at the 1998 Asian Games
20th-century South Korean women